A Haber is a worldwide news channel in Turkey. It was founded by Çalık Holding in 2011. Like the Turkey-wide ATV channel, A Haber belongs to Turkey's second-largest media group, Turkuvaz-AŞ. This in turn belongs to the Çalık Holding of Ahmet Çalık, who founded the station in 2011.

Anchors 
 Banu El
 Cansın Helvacı 
 Merve Türkay 
 Salih Nayman

References

External links 
  

Television stations in Turkey
Eyüp
Television channels and stations established in 2011
24-hour television news channels in Turkey